Demetrio Lozano Jarque (born September 26, 1975) is a Spanish handball player.

He participated at the 2008 summer Olympics in Beijing as a member of the Spain men's national handball team. The team won a bronze medal, defeating Croatia.

References
The Official Website of the Beijing 2008 Olympic Games

1975 births
Spanish male handball players
Liga ASOBAL players
SDC San Antonio players
BM Aragón players
FC Barcelona Handbol players
CB Ademar León players
Handball players at the 1996 Summer Olympics
Handball players at the 2000 Summer Olympics
Handball players at the 2008 Summer Olympics
Olympic handball players of Spain
Olympic bronze medalists for Spain
Living people
People from Alcalá de Henares
Olympic medalists in handball
Medalists at the 2008 Summer Olympics
Medalists at the 2000 Summer Olympics
Medalists at the 1996 Summer Olympics
Mediterranean Games gold medalists for Spain
Competitors at the 2005 Mediterranean Games
Mediterranean Games medalists in handball
Handball players from the Community of Madrid